The 1904 Colgate football team was an American football team that represented Colgate University as an independent during the 1904 college football season. In its second season under head coach Buck O'Neill, the team compiled an 8–1–1 record. F. Gorham Brigham was the team captain. The team played its home games on Whitnall Field in Hamilton, New York.

Schedule

References

Colgate
Colgate Raiders football seasons
Colgate football